Abdulrahman Hashim Al-Yami (born 19 June 1997) is a Saudi Arabian professional footballer who plays as a striker for Saudi club Al-Riyadh.

Career
Al-Yami is an academy graduate of Al-Hilal. He signed his first professional contract with the club on August 13, 2017. On July 8, 2018, Al-Yami was sent on loan to fellow Pro League side Al-Fayha for the 2018–19 season. On 23 January 2019, Al-Yami's loan was ended early and he returned to Al-Hilal. He made 8 appearances for Al-Fayha and scored once against Ohod in a 3–0 win.

Following his return to Al-Hilal, Al-Yami was included in the 2019 AFC Champions League squad. He made his first appearance since his return by coming off the bench against Al Ain in a 1–0 win. He made two further bench appearances and started the 2019 King Cup semi-final loss against Al-Taawoun.

On 19 July 2019, Al-Yami signed a three-year contract with Al-Hazem. He made his debut for Al-Hazem by coming off the bench in the 89th minute in a 1–1 draw against Al-Taawoun. On 29 August 2019, Al-Yami scored his first goal for Al-Hazem in a 2–1 loss against former club Al-Fayha.

On 9 January 2022, Al-Yami joined Damac on an 18-month contract. On 8 September 2022, Al-Yami joined First Division side Al-Riyadh.

Career statistics

Club

References

External links
 

1997 births
Living people
Saudi Arabian footballers
Association football forwards
Al Hilal SFC players
Al-Fayha FC players
Al-Hazem F.C. players
Ittihad FC players
Damac FC players
Al-Riyadh SC players
Saudi Professional League players
Saudi First Division League players
Saudi Arabia youth international footballers
Saudi Arabia international footballers